This is chronology of films produced in Ireland:

1910s

1920s

1930s

1940s

1950s

1960s

1970s

1980s

1990s

2000s

2010s

2020s

See also
 Cinema of Ireland
 :Category:Films shot in Ireland
 :Category:Irish-language films
 Cinema of Northern Ireland
 List of films set in Ireland
 List of films set in Northern Ireland

References

External links
 Irish film at the Internet Movie Database

Lists of Irish films